Guy Mone (Mohun) (died 1407) was an English royal administrator and bishop.

He held the offices of Receiver of the Chamber (1391 to 1398) and Master of the Jewel Office (1391 to 1398), Keeper of the Privy Seal (1396 to 1397) and Lord High Treasurer (1398) towards the end of the reign of Richard II of England, and was one of Richard's supporters.

He was bishop of St David's from 1397 to his death, being appointed on 30 August and consecrated on 11 November 1397.

Notes

External links
 His will

Year of birth unknown
1407 deaths
Bishops of St Davids
Lord High Treasurers of England
Lords Privy Seal
Masters of the Jewel Office